The Hallmark Sessions is an album by the Canadian jazz guitarist Lenny Breau that was released in 2003.

History
In his first professional solo recording session, Breau recorded these tracks in Toronto, Ontario, Canada, when he was 20 years old. His former manager kept the original tapes for over 40 years before they were re-discovered. Seven of the tracks include Rick Danko and Levon Helm as the rhythm section.

Reception

Elliott Simon, in his All About Jazz review, wrote, "The sound quality, aside from a few minor rough spots, is excellent and the six re-presented stereo versions of the trio pieces sparkle. Breau in a word is awesome and to think that his playing was this developed at such a young age is mind boggling." Writing for Allmusic, the critic Scott Yanow gave the album 4.5 out of 5 stars and wrote, "Hallmark Sessions is an extraordinary release... Breau plays beautiful chords (sounding a little like Johnny Smith in spots) and inventive single-note lines. It is remarkable that this music was not released until 2003, but a happy event that it was finally put out. This is a must for Breau fans and an important release for all jazz guitar lovers."

Track listing
Writing credits as shown on record label.
"It Could Happen to You" (Johnny Burke, Jimmy Van Heusen) – 5:42
"Oscar's Blues" (Lenny Breau) – 3:38
"I'll Remember April" (Don Raye, Gene de Paul, Patricia Johnston) – 4:25
"Undecided" (Charlie Shavers, Sid Robins) – 3:34
"My Old Flame" (Sam Coslow, Arthur Johnston) – 5:29
"'D' Minor Blues" (Breau) – 5:10
"'R' Tune" (Breau) – 3:20
"Lenny's Western Blues" (Breau) – 2:33
"Cannonball Rag" (Merle Travis) – 2:13
"Solea" (Traditional) – 4:01
"Taranta" (Traditional) – 3:58
"Arabian Fantasy" (Traditional) – 2:51
"Brazilian Love Song (Batucada)" (Luiz Bonfá) – 2:07
Bonus stereo version tracks:
"Oscar's Blues" (Moore) – 3:39
"I'll Remember April" (de Paul, Johnston, Raye) – 4:24
"Undecided" (Robins, Shavers) – 3:34
"My Old Flame" (Coslow, Johnston) – 5:29
"'D' Minor Blues" (Breau) – 5:08
"'R' Tune" (Breau) – 3:17

Personnel
Lenny Breau – guitar
Rick Danko – bass guitar
Levon Helm – drums
Production notes:
Paul Kohler – producer, art direction, mastering, mixing, graphic layout, liner notes

References

External links
lennybreau.com discography entry
Art of Life Records web site

Lenny Breau albums
2003 albums